Richard Yator (born 6 April 1998) is a Kenyan long-distance runner.

In 2015, he won the silver medal in the boys' 3000 metres at the 2015 African Youth Athletics Championships held in Reduit, Mauritius. In 2017, he won the bronze medal in the junior men's race at the 2017 IAAF World Cross Country Championships held in Kampala, Uganda.

In 2019, he competed in the senior men's race at the 2019 IAAF World Cross Country Championships held in Aarhus, Denmark. He finished in 13th place. A few months later, he competed in the men's 5000 metres event at the 2019 Diamond League Shanghai where he finished in 10th place with a time of 13:13.24. In the same year, he also represented Kenya at the 2019 African Games held in Rabat, Morocco. He competed in the men's 5000 metres and he won the bronze medal.

References

External links 
 

Living people
1998 births
Place of birth missing (living people)
Kenyan male long-distance runners
Kenyan male cross country runners
Athletes (track and field) at the 2019 African Games
African Games medalists in athletics (track and field)
African Games bronze medalists for Kenya